Warwick Boat Club is a rowing club on the River Avon.

History
The club was founded in 1861. Unusually it includes separate "sections" and good grounds for tennis, squash and bowls, and is affiliated to British Rowing. It has social events with catering, live bands, and barbeques on the banks of the river.

The club operates according to its values: progressive; positive; inclusive; safe; sustainable and always acting with integrity, and so attracts members from Warwick, Leamington, Stratford-upon-Avon, Solihull, Banbury, Coventry and surrounding areas. Its club/boat houses were upgraded by rebuilding in 2013.

References

Rowing clubs in England
Bowls clubs
Squash in England
Tennis clubs
Sports clubs established in 1861